Mastax alternans is a species of beetle in the family Carabidae with restricted distribution in the Democratic Republic of Congo.

References

Mastax alternans
Beetles described in 1959
Beetles of the Democratic Republic of the Congo
Endemic fauna of the Democratic Republic of the Congo